The 2015 Nigerian Senate election in Katsina State was held on March 28, 2015, to elect members of the Nigerian Senate to represent Katsina State. Mustapha Bukar representing Katsina North, Abu Ibrahim representing Katsina South and Kurfi Umaru representing Katsina Central all won on the platform of All Progressives Congress.

Overview

Summary

Results

Katsina North 
All Progressives Congress candidate Mustapha Bukar won the election, defeating People's Democratic Party candidate Yau Umar Gojo and other party candidates.

Katsina South 
All Progressives Congress candidate Abu Ibrahim won the election, defeating People's Democratic Party candidate Abdulahi Faskari and other party candidates.

Katsina Central 
All Progressives Congress candidate Kurfi Umaru won the election, defeating People's Democratic Party candidate Lamis Shehu and other party candidates.

References 

Katsina State Senate elections
March 2015 events in Nigeria
Kat